The First United Methodist Church is a historic church at 101 S. Izard Street in Forrest City, Arkansas.  It is a two-story brick structure, designed by Memphis architect John Gaisford and built in 1917 as the second church for its congregation.  One of Gaisford's last designs, it is Classical Revival in style, with a Greek-style temple front with full-height Ionic columns supporting a triangular pediment, with limestone trim accenting the brickwork.

The building was listed on the National Register of Historic Places in 1994.

See also
National Register of Historic Places listings in St. Francis County, Arkansas

References

United Methodist churches in Arkansas
Churches on the National Register of Historic Places in Arkansas
Neoclassical architecture in Arkansas
Churches completed in 1917
National Register of Historic Places in St. Francis County, Arkansas
Forrest City, Arkansas
Neoclassical church buildings in the United States
1917 establishments in Arkansas